The High Commissioner from New Zealand to Papua New Guinea is New Zealand's foremost diplomatic representative in the Independent State of Papua New Guinea, and in charge of New Zealand's diplomatic mission in Papua New Guinea.

The High Commission is located in Port Moresby, Papua New Guinea's capital city.  New Zealand has maintained a resident High Commissioner in Papua New Guinea since Papua New Guinea's independence in 1975, and a resident Head of Mission since 1974.

As fellow members of the Commonwealth of Nations, diplomatic relations between New Zealand and Papua New Guinea are at governmental level, rather than between Heads of State.  Thus, the countries exchange High Commissioners, rather than ambassadors.

List of heads of mission

Commissioners to Papua New Guinea
 Brian Poananga (1974–1975)

High Commissioners to Papua New Guinea
 Brian Poananga (1975–1976)
 Michael Mansfield (1976–1979)
 Alison Stokes (1979–1982)
 Tim Hannah (1982–1985)
 Gerald McGhie (1985–1988)
 Hilary Willberg (1988–1989)
 John Hayes (1989–1993)
 Maarten Wevers (1993–1994)
 John Clarke (1994–1997)
 Nigel Moore (1997–2001)
 Chris Seed (2001–2003)
 Laurie Markes (2003 - )

References
 Heads of Missions List: P.  New Zealand Ministry of Foreign Affairs and Trade.  Retrieved on 2006-07-08.

Papua New Guinea, High Commissioners from New Zealand to
 
New Zealand